Elaeocarpus hygrophilus is a species of plant in the Elaeocarpaceae family. It is distributed in Southeast Asia. The tree is 10–25 meters tall. The fruits are olive-like. The fruits are used as foods in some Southeast Asian countries like Thailand and Vietnam.

External links
Elaeocarpus hygrophilus

hygrophilus